Mladen Grujičić (born 13 April 1982) is a Bosnian Serb politician who is currently serving as the Mayor of Srebrenica since 2016, a town and municipality located in the easternmost part of Republika Srpska, an entity of Bosnia and Herzegovina. He is a member of the Alliance of Independent Social Democrats (SNSD).

Biography

Early life and career 
Grujičić was born in 1982 in Srebrenica. He left the town during the Bosnian War in which his father was killed fighting for the Army of Republika Srpska.

After finishing his studies at the Faculty of Technology in Zvornik which as a part of the University of East Sarajevo, he started his business career, and after that he was a high school professor in the chemistry group of subjects at the High School Center in Srebrenica. 

For several years, he led the Municipal Organization of Families of Captured and Killed Fighters and Missing Civilians in Srebrenica, and he was named "Humanist of the Year" by the republic organization for 2010.

Political career 
Grujičić is a longtime SNSD member and was a candidate for a member of local parliament in 2012.

On 10 July 2016, Mladen Grujičić a joint candidate of all Serb parties in Srebrenica started his campaign for the Mayor of Srebrenica for the 2016 local elections. His candidacy for mayor was announced on April 14, when a meeting of the leaders of nine Serb political parties from Srebrenica was held. At that time, it was agreed to run in the elections with a joint candidate for mayor within the coalition "Together for Srebrenica".

Grujičić defeated his rival Ćamil Duraković with 54.38% of the popular vote and took office as the new mayor of Srebrenica on 8 November 2016. This was the first time in 17 years that a Serb candidate won the elections.

Srebrenica genocide controversy 
Grujičić has been called a Serbian nationalist and Srebrenica genocide denier by the Bosniak public and his opponents. Talking about the Srebrenica massacre, Grujičić himself said this during the campaign:

References 

1982 births
Living people
People from Srebrenica
Serbs of Bosnia and Herzegovina
Deniers of the Bosnian genocide
Mayors of places in Bosnia and Herzegovina
Alliance of Independent Social Democrats politicians